Shepard Island or John Shepard Island is an island about  long, lying  west of Grant Island off the coast of Marie Byrd Land, Antarctica. Shepard Island is ice capped except at its northern, seaward side, and is almost wholly embedded in the Getz Ice Shelf. Shepard Island was discovered by the United States Antarctic Service (USAS) Expedition (1939–1941) and named for John Shepard Jr., a contributor to the expedition.

See also
 Composite Antarctic Gazetteer
 List of Antarctic and sub-Antarctic islands
 List of Antarctic islands south of 60° S 
 Mount Colburn
 SCAR
 Territorial claims in Antarctica

References

Islands of Marie Byrd Land